Feels Like Heaven… Sounds Like Shit is a 1995 remix album by Pigface.

Track listing
 Dialogue - Pigface 	
 Think (Addiction/Salvation Mix) - Martin Atkins 	
 Steamroller (Steaming Pig Mix) - Skatenigs	
 Hagseed (Slagseed Slagadelic Mix) - Psychic TV 	
 Dialogue - Pigface 	
 Fuck It Up (Did You Ever Get The Feeling?) 	
 Chikasaw (Jungle Dub Mix) - Law & Order 		
 Suck (Double Dipped And Plastered Mix)
 Asphole (On The Floor/We Know Who You Are)
 Steamroller (Club Mix) - DHS 		
 Dialogue - Michael Lawder 		
 Sick Asp Fuck (Number 1 Club Mix) - Pigface 		
 Empathy (Clarified Vision Mix) - Martin Atkins/Julian Herzfeld
 Divebomber (Devilish Mix) - Jason Mcninch
 Chikasaw (No Shit Pussy Mix) - Martin Atkins/Julian Herzfeld
 Chikasaw (Ten Inch Mix) - Youth

References

1995 remix albums
Pigface albums